Luca Alessandro Mihai (born 11 October 2003) is a Romanian professional footballer who plays as a central midfielder for Italian  club AlbinoLeffe on loan from SPAL.

Career
He made his senior debut for Trento on 3 September 2022, in a 2–0 Serie C loss over Juventus U23.

On 31 January 2023, Mihai moved on loan to AlbinoLeffe, with an option to buy.

References

2003 births
Living people
Footballers from Bucharest
Romanian footballers
Romania youth international footballers
Association football midfielders
Serie C players
S.P.A.L. players
A.C. Trento 1921 players
U.C. AlbinoLeffe players
Romanian expatriate footballers
Romanian expatriate sportspeople in Italy
Expatriate footballers in Italy